Agony is the second studio album by Italian death metal band Fleshgod Apocalypse.

On July 18, 2011, Fleshgod Apocalypse released a music video for "The Violation". On December 22, 2012, Fleshgod Apocalypse released a music video for "The Forsaking".

Reception

Max Lussier of The NewReview said that Agony "is a very different album than its predecessors". While he praised the speed of the songs and the guitar and drum work, he thought that the orchestral parts were "too large a part of the album's sound", resulting in "the guitar playing [becoming] slightly muddled and lost in the shuffle".

Track listing

Chart performance

Personnel
Tommaso Riccardi - lead vocals, rhythm guitar
Cristiano Trionfera - lead guitar, backing vocals
Paolo Rossi - bass, clean vocals
Francesco Paoli - drums, additional guitars
Francesco Ferrini - pianos, orchestral samples

References

Fleshgod Apocalypse albums
2011 albums
Nuclear Blast albums